Richard Pacheco (November 2, 1924 – September 5, 2015) was an American politician. He served as a Democratic member for the 7th district of the Arizona House of Representatives.

Life and career 
Pacheco was born in Las Vegas, New Mexico. He attended New Mexico Highlands University and served in the United States Army.

Pacheco represented the 7th district of the Arizona House of Representatives. 

Pacheco died in September 2015 in Chandler, Arizona, at the age of 90.

References 

1924 births
2015 deaths
People from Las Vegas, New Mexico
Democratic Party members of the Arizona House of Representatives
20th-century American politicians
New Mexico Highlands University alumni